Ageusia (from negative prefix a- and Ancient Greek γεῦσις geûsis 'taste') is the loss of taste functions of the tongue, particularly the inability to detect sweetness, sourness, bitterness, saltiness, and umami (meaning 'pleasant/savory taste'). It is sometimes confused with anosmia – a loss of the sense of smell. Because the tongue can only indicate texture and differentiate between sweet, sour, bitter, salty, and umami, most of what is perceived as the sense of taste is actually derived from smell. True ageusia is relatively rare compared to hypogeusia – a partial loss of taste – and dysgeusia – a distortion or alteration of taste.

Causes

The main causes of taste disorders are head trauma, infections of upper respiratory tract, exposure to toxic substances, iatrogenic causes, medicines, glossodynia ("burning mouth syndrome (BMS)") and COVID-19.

Head trauma can cause lesions in regions of the central nervous system which are involved in processing taste stimuli, including thalamus, brain stem, and temporal lobes; it can also cause damage to neurological pathways involved in transmission of taste stimuli.

Neurological damage
Tissue damage to the nerves that support the tongue can cause ageusia, especially damage to the chorda tympani nerve and the glossopharyngeal nerve. The chorda tympani nerve passes taste for the front two-thirds of the tongue and the glossopharyngeal nerve passes taste for the back third of the tongue. The lingual nerve (which is a branch of the trigeminal V3 nerve, but carries taste sensation back to the chorda tympani nerve to the geniculate ganglion of the facial nerve) can also be damaged during otologic surgery, causing a feeling of metal taste.

Problems with the endocrine system
Deficiency of vitamin B3 (niacin) and zinc can cause problems with the endocrine system, which may cause taste loss or alteration. Disorders of the endocrine system, such as Cushing's syndrome, hypothyroidism and diabetes mellitus, can cause similar problems. Ageusia can also be caused by medicinal side-effects from antirheumatic drugs such as penicillamine, antiproliferative drugs such as cisplatin, ACE inhibitors, and other drugs including azelastine, clarithromycin, terbinafine, and zopiclone.

COVID-19 

In April 2020, 88% of a series of over 400 COVID-19 disease patients in Europe were reported to report gustatory dysfunction (86% reported olfactory dysfunction). Research suggests that the loss of taste resulting from COVID-19 might be caused by impairments to the gustatory (and olfactory) system.

Other causes
Local damage and inflammation that interferes with the taste buds or local nervous system, such as that stemming from radiation therapy, glossitis, tobacco use, or the wearing of dentures, can also cause ageusia. Other known causes include loss of taste sensitivity from aging (causing a difficulty detecting salty or bitter taste), anxiety disorder, cancer, kidney failure and liver failure.

Diagnosis
Aguesia is diagnosed by an otolaryngologist, who can evaluate a patient's loss of taste among other things. To do this, a specialist will look into any other factors that could be causing ageusia, such as examining the head, nose, ears, and mouth. An otolaryngologist can also conduct a series of tests to assess the severity of ageusia, which includes identifying specific tastes that the patient can sense or recognize.

References

External links 
 MedTerms Online Medical Dictionary. "Ageusia". Retrieved April 15, 2005.
 Family Practice Notebook. "Taste Sensation". Retrieved April 15, 2005.
 Massachusetts Eye and Ear Infirmary. "Taste Disorders". Retrieved May 26, 2010.

Gustatory system
Laryngology
Symptoms and signs of mental disorders

ru:Агевзия